Hubina is a village and municipality in Piešťany District in the Trnava Region of western Slovakia.

History
In historical records the village was first mentioned in 1353.

Geography
The municipality lies at an altitude of 200 metres and covers an area of 26.843 km². It has a population of about 480 people.

Genealogical resources

The records for genealogical research are available at the state archive "Statny Archiv in Bratislava, Slovakia"

 Roman Catholic church records (births/marriages/deaths): 1783-1905 (parish B)

See also
 List of municipalities and towns in Slovakia

References

External links

  Official page
Surnames of living people in Hubina

Villages and municipalities in Piešťany District